Diamond Head is the first studio album by English rock musician Phil Manzanera. It was released in 1975, originally on Island Records in the UK (who was handling all E.G. recordings) and in the US on Atco Records. The sound quality on the US album was deemed to be worse than the UK album, so the UK import became a popular seller in the speciality record shops who sold Roxy Music and other UK bands. The diesel locomotive featured on the cover art is an EMD E9.

Unlike other solo albums issued by an instrumental member of an existing band (Manzanera was Roxy Music's lead guitarist), Diamond Head, which was a marginal success, featured a number of vocal songs performed by guest musicians. Oddly enough, Bryan Ferry was the only Roxy music member not to feature on the album.

Metal band Diamond Head took their name from the album.

Track listing
All songs by Phil Manzanera, except where noted.

Track-by-track personnel
"Frontera"
 Robert Wyatt – lead vocals, timbales, cabasa, backing vocals
 Brian Eno – backing vocals
 Phil Manzanera – guitars
 John Wetton – bass
 Paul Thompson – drums
"Diamond Head"
 Eddie Jobson – all strings, Fender piano
 Phil Manzanera – guitars
 John Wetton – bass
 Paul Thompson – drums
 Brian Eno – guitar treatments
"Big Day"
 Brian Eno – vocals
 Phil Manzanera – guitars, tiplé, fuzz guitar
 Brian Turrington – bass
 John Wetton – bass
 Paul Thompson – drums
"The Flex"
 Andy Mackay – soprano and alto saxophones
 Phil Manzanera – guitars
 Eddie Jobson – electric clavinet
 John Wetton – bass
 Paul Thompson – drums
 Sonny Akpan – congas
"Same Time Next Week"
 John Wetton – lead vocals, bass, mellotron
 Doreen Chanter – lead vocals
 Andy Mackay – saxophones
 Phil Manzanera – guitars
 Paul Thompson – drums
 Sonny Akpan – congas
 Charles Hayward – tree bells
"Miss Shapiro"
 Brian Eno – vocals, rhythm guitar, piano, handclaps
 Phil Manzanera – guitars, organ, piano, bass, handclaps
 Brian Turrington  – bass
 Paul Thompson – drums
 Bill MacCormick – handclaps
"East of Echo"
 Quiet Sun:
 Bill MacCormick – fuzz bass themes
 Charles Hayward – percussion
 Dave Jarret – keyboard themes
 Phil Manzanera – guitars
 Ian MacDonald – bagpipes
 John Wetton – bass
 Paul Thompson – drums, extra drums
 Brian Eno – guitar treatments
"Lagrima"
 Andy Mackay – oboe
 Phil Manzanera – guitar
"Alma"
 Bill MacCormick – vocals
 Phil Manzanera – guitars, organ, tiplé, string synthesizer, vocals, fuzz bass
 Eddie Jobson – synthesizer
 John Wetton – bass
 Paul Thompson – drums

Personnel
 Phil Manzanera — electric 6 and 12 string guitars, tiple, acoustic guitar, synthesized guitar, bass, string synthesizer, organ, piano, vocals
 Robert Wyatt — vocals, timbales, cabasa, background vocals
 Brian Eno — vocals, treatments, rhythm guitar, piano, percussion
 Eddie Jobson — strings, fender piano, electric clavinet, synthesizer
 Dave Jarrett — keyboards
 Andy Mackay — soprano and alto saxophone, oboe
 Ian MacDonald — bagpipes
 John Wetton — bass, vocals, mellotron
 Bill MacCormick — bass, vocals
 Brian Turrington — bass
 Paul Thompson — drums
 Danny Heibs — percussion
 Chyke Madu — percussion
 Sonny Akpan — congas, percussion, bongos, big gong, maracas
 Charles Hayward — percussion
 Doreen Chanter — vocals
Technical
Rhett Davies — engineer
Robert Ash — assistant engineer
Jon Prew — photography

References

1975 debut albums
Island Records albums
E.G. Records albums
Phil Manzanera albums
Albums produced by Phil Manzanera